Peru made its Paralympic Games début at the 1972 Summer Paralympics in Heidelberg. It sent only one competitor, swimmer J. Gonzales (full name not recorded). Competing in disability category 4, he entered three events, but did not win any medals. In the 3x25m medley, his time of 1:21.9 was 1.2 seconds too slow to make it out of the heats and into the final round. In the 50m breaststroke, he was also eliminated in the heats. His best result came in the 50m backstroke. Qualifying as fourth fastest, he improved his time in the final, but finished fourth, in 44.266s.

Results

See also
Peru at the 1972 Summer Olympics

References

Nations at the 1972 Summer Paralympics
1972
Paralympics